Legislative Television (officially The Legislative Television Broadcast and Recording Services) is a cable  television network exclusively in the Canadian province of Nova Scotia. Legislative Television was established in 1991 to broadcast the parliamentary proceedings of the Legislative Assembly of Nova Scotia. It is available on EastLink TV digital cable channel 95, as well as on analog cable 10 (or 5 in the Annapolis Valley) during portions of the day from Tuesday to Thursday. The channel is also available on Bell Aliant TV channel 230. The channel does not carry advertising during programming.

Legislative Television also offers audio transcripts of the sessions of government, and broadcasts a live television feed on its website.

External links
 Legislative Television

Television channels and stations established in 1991
Commercial-free television networks
Legislature broadcasters in Canada
Politics of Nova Scotia
Television stations in Nova Scotia
General Assembly of Nova Scotia
1991 establishments in Nova Scotia